Damir Mirvić (born 30 November 1982) is a Bosnian football defender, who plays in the Belgian amateur leagues.

Club career
After spending time at FK Sarajevo, KAA Gent, KSV Roeselare and Wezet (Visé) he joined SK Maldegem Wezet in January 2014 after a few months out of contract. In summer 2016, he moved to Excelsior Mariakerke.

International career
He was called up by Miroslav Blažević to the Bosnia and Herzegovina national team in 2009, but did not play.

References

External links
Profile at footmercato.net

1982 births
Living people
People from Bihać
Association football central defenders
Bosnia and Herzegovina footballers
Bosnia and Herzegovina under-21 international footballers
NK Jedinstvo Bihać players
FK Sarajevo players
K.A.A. Gent players
K.S.V. Roeselare players
C.S. Visé players
Premier League of Bosnia and Herzegovina players
Belgian Pro League players
Challenger Pro League players
Bosnia and Herzegovina expatriate footballers
Expatriate footballers in Belgium
Bosnia and Herzegovina expatriate sportspeople in Belgium